Kenneth Utt (July 13, 1921 – January 19, 1994), was an American film producer and unit production manager. He received the Academy Award for Best Picture for producing The Silence of the Lambs (1991).

Life and career 
Utt was born in Winston-Salem, North Carolina, on July 13, 1921. He graduated from Elon College (now Elon University) in Elon, N.C. in 1942. He received a scholarship to Juilliard School where he studied vocals in hopes of becoming an opera singer. Utt served in the Army Air Forces during World War II. He returned home and became a stage and radio actor, appearing in shows like Carousel.

Utt began working in production on stage performances of Peter Pan, the lesser known 1950 Broadway version with music by Leonard Bernstein. He then became a film line producer for films like Midnight Cowboy (1969), The French Connection (1971), The Seven-Ups (1973) and All That Jazz (1979). Utt was a producer and unit production manager on four Jonathan Demme films: Something Wild (1986), Married to the Mob (1988), The Silence of the Lambs (1991) and Philadelphia (1993), with Lambs and Philadelphia earning awards at the Oscars. Utt was among the three producers who received Best Picture for Lambs, in which he also made a cameo appearance.

Death 
Utt died on January 19, 1994, at Mount Sinai Hospital in Manhattan at the age of 72. The cause was bone cancer. He is survived by his wife Angie, son Tim Utt, and daughter Robin Utt Fajardo.

Filmography 
He was a producer in all films unless otherwise noted.

Film

Production manager

As an actor

Miscellaneous crew

Location management

Thanks

Television

Production manager

As an actor

Miscellaneous crew

Thanks

References

External links 

1921 births
1994 deaths
American film producers
Producers who won the Best Picture Academy Award
Deaths from bone cancer
Actors from Winston-Salem, North Carolina
Juilliard School alumni
American male stage actors
American male radio actors
Male actors from North Carolina
Deaths from cancer in New York (state)
United States Army Air Forces personnel of World War II
20th-century American male actors
20th-century American businesspeople
Unit production managers